Vasant Narkar is an Indian film and documentary director and writer. His work as a filmmaker includes the films The Lady Dabang, Odhani and Dikro Maro Vahal No Varasdaar.

Early life and education
Narkar was born in Ahmedabad, Gujarat to a family from Maharashtra. As he grew up in Gujarat, his schooling was in Gujarati. Narkar was interested in becoming an actor when he was in 7th standard at school and enrolled in a college where there was a drama club.

Career
Narkar has been in the Gujarati film industry for thirty years as an actor, writer, director and producer. In 2014 Narkar's movie The Lady Dabang was centred around its female lead, played by Gujarati actress Hemangini Kaj. In July 2015 the action comedy movie was directed by Narkar and produced by Shailesh Shah. In 2016 Narkar directed 3 November, his first film in Hindi.

Filmography

Feature films

Television

Stage

References

External links

Living people
20th-century Indian film directors
Artists from Ahmedabad
Hindi-language film directors
Gujarati-language film directors
Film directors from Gujarat
Year of birth missing (living people)